John Aikin (15 January 1747 – 7 December 1822) was an English medical doctor and surgeon. Later in life he devoted himself wholly to biography and writing in periodicals.

Life
He was born at Kibworth Harcourt, Leicestershire, England, son of Dr John Aikin, Unitarian divine, and received his elementary education at the Nonconformist academy at Warrington, where his father was a tutor. He studied medicine at the University of Edinburgh, and in London under Dr. William Hunter. He practised as a surgeon at Chester and Warrington. Finally, he went to Leiden in Holland, earned an M.D. in 1780, and in 1784 established himself as a doctor in Great Yarmouth.

In 1792, one of his pamphlets having given offence, he moved to London, where he practised as a consulting physician. He lived in Church Street, Stoke Newington. However, he concerned himself more with the advocacy of liberty of conscience than with his professional duties, and he began at an early period to devote himself to literary pursuits, to which his contributions were incessant. When Richard Phillips founded The Monthly Magazine in 1796, Aikin was its first editor. In conjunction with his sister, Anna Laetitia Barbauld, he published a popular series of volumes entitled Evenings at Home (6 vols, 1792–1795), for elementary family reading, which were translated into almost every European language.

Works

In 1798 Aikin retired altogether from medicine and devoted himself to literary undertakings such as his General Biography (10 vols, 1799–1815). His other work included Biographical Memoirs of Medicine in Great Britain (1780),The Arts of Life... described in a series of letters. For the instruction of young persons (1802, reprinted 1807), and The Lives of John Selden, Esq., and Archbishop Usher (1812).

Apart from editing The Monthly Magazine (1796–1807) and Dodsley's Annual Register (1811–1815), Aikin produced a paper called The Athenaeum in 1807–1809, not to be confused with the well-known magazine The Athenaeum (1828–1921).

Family
Aikin had four children, three sons and a daughter. The eldest son, Arthur, was a prominent scientist, and the youngest, Edmund, an architect. The second son, Charles, was adopted by Aikin's sister, who had no children. Through Charles, Aikin was grandfather to the writer Anna Letitia Le Breton. His daughter Lucy was a biographer, who in 1823 published Memoir of John Aikin, M.D., with a selection of Miscellaneous Pieces, Biographical, Moral and Critical.

Bibliography
Evenings at Home (1792–95)
Letters from a father to his son, on various topics, relative to literature and the conduct of life (1794)
A Description of the Country from Thirty to Forty Miles Round Manchester (1795)m referenced in The German Ideology by Karl Marx
General Biography (10 volumes, completed in 1815)
Annals of the Reign of George III (1816)
Select Works of the British Poets (1820)

References

Sources

Further reading

External links
 
 
 

1747 births
1822 deaths
People from Kibworth
English non-fiction writers
English biographers
English Unitarians
Anna Laetitia Barbauld
18th-century English writers
18th-century English male writers
19th-century English writers
Alumni of the University of Edinburgh Medical School
Writers of Gothic fiction
English male poets
Women biographers
Male biographers